Adam Castillejo, also known as "The London Patient", is the second person known to have been cured of HIV infection. Castillejo, who lives in London and works as a chef, is of Wayuu indigenous ancestry, and was born in Venezuela.

His body became resistant to HIV infection after receiving a bone marrow transplant in 2016 to treat Hodgkin's lymphoma. The donor carried the CCR5-Δ32 mutation which gives resistance from HIV infection. He was treated by Professor Ravindra Gupta.

See also 

 Timothy Ray Brown
 Stephen Crohn
 Innate resistance to HIV
 Long term nonprogressor
 HIV/AIDS research

References 

Living people
Year of birth missing (living people)
People with HIV/AIDS